Ivo Minář won in the final 3–6, 6–2, 6–3, against Simone Vagnozzi.

Seeds

Draw

Finals

Top half

Bottom half

References
Main Draw
Qualifying Singles

Palm Hills International Tennis Challenger - Singles